Lloyd William Peterson (August 16, 1900 – September 22, 1986) was an American college football, basketball, and wrestling coach. He served as the head football coach at the University of Minnesota Duluth from 1931 to 1957, compiling a record of 84–76–9. Peterson was also the head basketball coach at Minnesota–Duluth from 1932 to 1943 and the school's athletic director from 1955 until his retirement in 1969.

Peterson played college football at the University of Minnesota as a fullback from 1922 to 1924 before graduating in 1925. He coached football for one year at Owatonna High School in Owatonna, Minnesota and then five years at University High School in Minneapolis before he was hired at Minnesota Duluth.

Peterson died on September 22, 1986, at his home in Duluth, Minnesota.

Head coaching record

References

External links
 Minnesota Duluth Hall of Fame profile
 

1900 births
1986 deaths
American football fullbacks
Minnesota Duluth Bulldogs athletic directors
Minnesota Duluth Bulldogs football coaches
Minnesota Duluth Bulldogs men's basketball coaches
Minnesota Golden Gophers football players
College wrestling coaches in the United States
High school football coaches in Minnesota
High school track and field coaches in the United States
People from Willmar, Minnesota
Coaches of American football from Minnesota
Players of American football from Minnesota
Basketball coaches from Minnesota